The 2008 Dunlop British Open Championships was held at the Echo Arena Liverpool from 6–12 May 2008. David Palmer won his fourth British Open career title by defeating James Willstrop in the final.

Seeds

Draw and results

Main draw

References

Men's British Open Squash Championships
Squash in England
Men's British Open
Men's British Open Squash Championship
Men's British Open Squash Championship
2000s in Liverpool
Sports competitions in Liverpool